Duncan Sarkies is a New Zealand screenwriter, playwright, novelist, stand-up comic and short story writer.

Sarkies grew up in the South Island city of Dunedin and is the brother of Robert Sarkies a New Zealand film director who is also a scriptwriter. Sarkies is best known for writing Scarfies, a black comedy-thriller about university students in Dunedin, and New Zealand's sixth-highest-grossing film. He wrote New Fans, the tenth episode of the comedy series Flight of the Conchords.

Sarkies debut novel Two Little Boys was published in March 2008, and is being made into a film (also called Two Little Boys) during 2011.

Awards
Sarkies was awarded the Sunday Star Times Bruce Mason Playwriting Award in 1994. In 1995, he won the Chapman Tripp Theatre Award for Best New Zealand Play for his 1994 work Saving Grace. In 1998 he was awarded the Louis Johnson New Writers Bursary. His book of short stories Stray Thoughts and Nose Bleeds won the Montana New Zealand's Hubert Church NZSA Best First Book of Fiction Award in 2000.

Sarkies' works

Plays
The Ceramic Camel (1993)
Lovepuke (1993)*
Saving Grace (1994)
Snooze (1997)
Twelve (1997)
Blue Vein (1997)
Special (1997)
Bystander (1998)

*Published in Eleven Young Playwrights (1994)

Podcasts

The Mysterious secrets of Uncle Berties Botanarium

Novels
Two Little Boys (2008)
The Demolition of the Century (2013)

Films
Scarfies
Two Little Boys (film)

Television
New Fans, the tenth episode of the first season of the comedy series Flight of the Conchords
The New Cup, the second episode of the second season of the comedy series Flight of the Conchords

References

External links
duncansarkies.com

Living people
New Zealand male novelists
21st-century New Zealand dramatists and playwrights
New Zealand screenwriters
Male screenwriters
New Zealand male short story writers
New Zealand stand-up comedians
Entertainers from Dunedin
Year of birth missing (living people)
21st-century New Zealand novelists
New Zealand male dramatists and playwrights
21st-century New Zealand short story writers
21st-century New Zealand male writers
21st-century screenwriters
Writers from Dunedin